Antoinette Gauthier (born 8 March 1955) is a Haitian sprinter. She competed in the women's 100 metres at the 1976 Summer Olympics.

References

External links
 

1955 births
Living people
Athletes (track and field) at the 1976 Summer Olympics
Haitian female sprinters
Olympic athletes of Haiti
Place of birth missing (living people)
Olympic female sprinters